Yutaka Fuji is a Japanese mixed martial artist.

Mixed martial arts record

|-
| Loss
| align=center| 0-3
| Kazuhiro Kusayanagi
| Submission (armbar)
| Shooto - Shooto
| 
| align=center| 1
| align=center| 0:00
| Tokyo, Japan
| 
|-
| Loss
| align=center| 0-2
| Manabu Yamada
| Submission (kneebar)
| Shooto - Shooto
| 
| align=center| 1
| align=center| 1:39
| Tokyo, Japan
| 
|-
| Loss
| align=center| 0-1
| Satoshi Honma
| Submission (armbar)
| Shooto - Shooto
| 
| align=center| 2
| align=center| 2:36
| Tokyo, Japan
|

See also
List of male mixed martial artists

References

External links
 
 Yutaka Fuji at mixedmartialarts.com

Japanese male mixed martial artists
Living people
Year of birth missing (living people)